Matthew Raymond Dillon (born February 18, 1964) is an American actor. He has received various accolades, including an Academy Award and Grammy nomination.

Dillon made his feature film debut in Over the Edge (1979) and established himself as a teen idol by starring in the films My Bodyguard (1980), Little Darlings (1980), three of five S. E. Hinton book adaptations Tex (1982), Rumble Fish (1983) and The Outsiders (1983) as well as The Flamingo Kid (1984). From the late 1980s onward, Dillon achieved further success, starring in Drugstore Cowboy (1989), Singles (1992), The Saint of Fort Washington (1993), To Die For (1995), Beautiful Girls (1996), In & Out (1997), There's Something About Mary (1998), and Wild Things (1998). In a 1991 article, movie critic Roger Ebert referred to him as the best actor within his age group, along with Sean Penn.

In the 2000s, he made his directing debut with City of Ghosts (2002) and went on to star in the films Factotum (2005), You, Me and Dupree (2006), Nothing but the Truth (2008), Sunlight Jr. (2013) and The House That Jack Built (2018). For Crash (2004), he won an Independent Spirit Award and was nominated for a Golden Globe Award and the Academy Award for Best Supporting Actor. He had earlier been nominated for the Grammy Award for Best Spoken Word Album for narrating Jack Kerouac's On the Road. In 2015, he starred in the first season of the FOX television series Wayward Pines, for which he was nominated for a Saturn Award.

Early life
Dillon was born in New Rochelle, New York to homemaker Mary Ellen and Paul Dillon, a portrait painter and sales manager for toy bear manufacturer Union Camp. Paul Dillon also was the long-time golf coach at Fordham University, having been enshrined in the school's Hall of Fame in 2019 His paternal grandmother was the sister of comic strip artist Alex Raymond, the creator of Flash Gordon. Dillon is the second of six children with one sister and four brothers, one of whom is actor Kevin Dillon. Dillon was raised in a close-knit Roman Catholic family of Irish descent. He grew up in Mamaroneck, New York.

Career

In 1978, Jane Bernstein and a friend were helping director Jonathan Kaplan cast the teen drama Over the Edge when they found Dillon cutting class at Hommocks Middle School in Larchmont. Dillon auditioned for a role and made his debut in the film. The film received a regional, limited theatrical release in May 1979, and grossed only slightly over $200,000. Dillon's performance was well-received, which led to his casting in two films released the following year: the teenage sex comedy Little Darlings, in which Kristy McNichol's character loses her virginity to a boy from the camp across the lake, played by Dillon, and the more serious teen dramedy My Bodyguard, where he played a high-school bully opposite Chris Makepeace. The films, released in March and July 1980, respectively, were box office successes and raised Dillon's profile among teenage audiences.

Another of Dillon's early roles was in the Jean Shepherd PBS special The Great American Fourth of July and Other Disasters. The only available copies of this film are stored at UCLA, where a legal dispute makes it unavailable to the public.

One of his next roles was in Liar's Moon, where he played Jack Duncan, a poor Texas boy madly in love with a rich banker's daughter. In the early 1980s, Dillon also had prominent roles in three adaptations of S. E. Hinton novels: Tex (1982), The Outsiders (1983) and Rumble Fish (1983). All three films were shot in Tulsa, Oklahoma, Hinton's hometown. The Outsiders and Rumble Fish had Dillon working with Francis Ford Coppola and Diane Lane. He followed those up with The Flamingo Kid in 1984. He made his Broadway debut with the play The Boys of Winter in 1985. Dillon did voiceover work in the 1987 documentary film Dear America: Letters Home from Vietnam. In 1985, Dillon was namechecked in the lyrics of the Roger Daltrey song 'After The Fire' (written by Pete Townshend). In 1989, Dillon won critical acclaim for his performance as a drug addict in Gus Van Sant's Drugstore Cowboy.

Dillon continued to work in the early 1990s with roles in films like Singles (1992). He had a resurgence when he played Nicole Kidman's husband in To Die For (1995), as well as starring roles in Wild Things (1998) and There's Something About Mary (1998), for which he received an MTV Movie Award for Best Villain.

In 2002, he wrote and directed the film City of Ghosts, starring himself, James Caan and Gérard Depardieu. In 2005, he starred in Factotum, a film adaptation of an autobiographical work by Charles Bukowski. Two years later he received critical praise and earned Best Supporting Actor Golden Globe and Academy Award nominations for his role in Crash, a film co-written and directed by Paul Haggis. In 2005, Dillon co-starred in Disney's Herbie: Fully Loaded and on March 11, 2006, hosted Saturday Night Live, in which he impersonated Greg Anderson and Rod Serling in sketches.

Dillon starred in the comedy You, Me and Dupree, opposite Kate Hudson and Owen Wilson. The film opened on July 14, 2006. On September 29, 2006, Dillon was honored with the Premio Donostia prize in the San Sebastián International Film Festival.

Dillon contributed his voice as the narrator, Sal Paradise, in an audiobook version of Jack Kerouac's novel On the Road. In 2006, he narrated Once in a Lifetime: The Extraordinary Story of the New York Cosmos.

Dillon appeared in several music videos during his career. He made a cameo appearance as a detective in Madonna's Bad Girl music video which also stars Christopher Walken. Dillon appeared in 1987 in the music video for "Fairytale of New York" by the Irish folk-punk band The Pogues, playing a cop who escorts lead singer Shane MacGowan into the "drunk tank". In 2007, the band Dinosaur Jr. hired Dillon to direct the video for their single "Been There All The Time" from the album Beyond. That year, he guest-starred on The Simpsons episode "Midnight Towboy". Early in 2015, he played the role of a Secret Service agent in the FOX 10-episode series Wayward Pines.

In 2018, Dillon played the lead role in the Lars von Trier thriller The House That Jack Built.

Personal life
Matt was in a relationship with Cameron Diaz from 1995 to 1998. Since 2014 he has been in a relationship with Italian actress, dancer and choreographer Roberta Mastromichele.

Dillon is an aficionado and collector of Latin music, with a large collection of vinyl, including a notable library of Cuban 78s.

Filmography

Film

Television

Awards and nominations

References

External links

1964 births
20th-century American male actors
21st-century American male actors
American male child actors
American male film actors
American male television actors
El Camino College Compton Center alumni
Independent Spirit Award for Best Male Lead winners
Independent Spirit Award for Best Supporting Male winners
Lee Strasberg Theatre and Film Institute alumni
Living people
Male actors from New Rochelle, New York
Mamaroneck High School alumni
Outstanding Performance by a Cast in a Motion Picture Screen Actors Guild Award winners
People from Mamaroneck, New York
American people of Irish descent